The Seri Wawasan Bridge is one of the main bridges in the planned city Putrajaya, the new (2001) Malaysian federal territory and administrative centre. This futuristic asymmetric cable-stayed bridge with a forward-inclined pylon has a sailing ship appearance, accented at night with changeable color lighting.  The bridge, also called Bridge No. 9, crosses Putrajaya Lake, an artificial lake made to provide natural cooling, and connects Precinct 2 on the Core Island, where the main government buildings are located, to the residential area of Precinct 8, 9.

Structure

To counterbalance these front stays, a combination of 21 pairs of cable backstays and structural steel tie back was used. The back stay anchored at the (next-) highest point of the pylon is anchored at the curved backstay anchorage point (next-) nearest to the pylon, creating a crisscross‐over pattern from the side elevation, which adds to the aesthetic of the bridge. The overall complexity of the back stay tie back structure, however, may be aesthetically distracting. The inclined concrete pylon and the backstays are anchored into bore piled foundation off the roadway in precinct 8.

The bridge carries a dual three lane carriageways of 18.6 m width each, comprising 3 x 3.5 m width lanes, 0.5 m hard shoulder, 0.5 m marginal strip.

Gallery

See also
Other bridges providing access to the Core Island in the planned city Putrajaya, Malaysia
Seri Saujana Bridge
Seri Perdana Bridge
Seri Setia Bridge
Seri Gemilang Bridge
Seri Bakti Bridge
Seri Bestari Bridge

References

External links

Bridges in Putrajaya
Cable-stayed bridges in Malaysia
Bridges completed in 2003